This is a list of wealthiest charitable foundations worldwide. It consists of the 45 largest charitable foundations, private foundations engaged in philanthropy, and other charitable organizations such as charitable trusts that have disclosed their assets. In many countries, asset disclosure is not legally required or made public.

Only nonprofit foundations are included in this list. Organizations that are part of a larger company are excluded, such as holding companies.

The entries are ordered by the size of the organization's financial endowment. The endowment value is a rounded estimate measured in United States dollars, based on the exchange rates  December 31, 2020. Due to fluctuations in holdings, currency exchange and asset values, this list only represents the valuation of each foundation on a single day.

Wealthiest foundations by endowment value

See also
 List of charitable foundations
 List of wealthiest organizations

References

External links 
 Top US Foundations
 Top 10 Wealthiest Charitable Foundations
 List of Foundations

Foundations, wealthiest
Foundations, wealthiest
Foundations
Financial endowments
Wealthiest charitable foundationsni